The Taro Okamoto Award for Contemporary Art (TARO Award) is a Japanese award which aims to support and celebrate those artists who succeed the challenging spirit of Taro Okamoto manifested in the making of creative works with individual  expression. There was the application of 678 works in 2007, and 24 works were accepted for the preliminary selection.

Winners 
Mika Aoki, ALIMO, ENERGY CENTER, Miyuki Inoue, Junpei Ueda, Masamitsu Katsu, Ryo Kaneko /Nobi-ANIKI, Takashi Kuniya, KOSUGE1-16, Yasuka Gotou, Hiroyuki Saitou, Junji Shiotsu, Kinichi Shinomiya, Motomasa Suzuki, Kanako Zuigyou, Shouko Takeuchi, Hideyuki Tanaka, Kenichirou Taniguchi, Kouta Nakamura, palla / Kazuhiko Kawahara, Yukihiro Yamagami, Youna Kousagiuguisu, Keita Yoshitani, Shou Yoshida, Makiko Tsuji, Kyun-Chome

See also 
Taro Okamoto

External links
 Taro Okamoto Museum of Art Official Website in English

Japanese awards
Contemporary art awards
Japanese contemporary art
Japanese art awards